Senopterina varia is a species of signal flies (insects in the family Platystomatidae).

References

Platystomatidae
Articles created by Qbugbot
Insects described in 1900